Déogracias Maurile Gloire Bassinga (born 11 August 2005) is a Congolese professional footballer who plays as a forward for CSMD Diables Noirs.

International career

Youth
Bassinga played at the 2023 Africa U-20 Cup of Nations, where he scored four goals, including a hat trick in the quarter-final game against Tunisia.

Senior
Bassinga represented the Congo at the 2022 African Nations Championship, having a goal ruled out by VAR against Niger.

Career statistics

International

References

2005 births
Living people
Congolese footballers
Republic of the Congo youth international footballers
Republic of the Congo international footballers
Association football forwards
CSMD Diables Noirs players